The Palazzo  (also called The Palazzo at The Venetian) is a luxury hotel and casino resort located on the Las Vegas Strip in Paradise, Nevada. It is the tallest completed building in Nevada. Designed by the Dallas-based HKS, Inc., the hotel offers luxury in an Italian Renaissance ambiance. The hotel and casino are part of a larger complex (operated as one hotel) comprising the adjoining Venetian Resort and Casino and Venetian Expo, all of which are owned by Vici Properties and operated by Apollo Global Management.

The hotel complex is the second largest hotel in the world.

In its first year of eligibility, The Palazzo was awarded the AAA Five Diamond Award for 2009, and had been awarded the honor every year until 2014. After 2014, The Venetian and The Palazzo no longer receive AAA Diamond awards, as the management has refused further AAA inspections.

History

Early history
By 1949, the property was occupied by the Ottilia Villa Motel, the eight-room Park Lane Motel, and a restaurant named Maggie's. The Carousel Motel opened on the property in 1953, and the adjacent Park Lane Motel was incorporated into the Carousel around 1954. The Ottilia Villa was renamed as the Spanish Trail Motel in 1957.

The motel was owned by Bernie Zeldin, and was named after Illinois' Tam O'Shanter Golf Course, where Zeldin frequently played. The motel had 100 rooms, and featured a distinctive neon sign resembling a tam o' shanter cap. The sign was later donated to the city's Neon Museum. The Spanish Trail Motel went out of business around 1960. In 1962, it reopened as the Imperial 400 Motel.

Zeldin declined numerous offers to purchase the Tam O'Shanter. Billionaire Howard Hughes attempted to purchase the Tam O'Shanter at some point, initially offering $3 million. However, Hughes was late in delivering the money, and Zeldin subsequently raised the price to $6 million. When Hughes was late again in delivering the money, Zeldin called off negotiations. The Carousel Motel became the Sand Dunes Motel in 1973, and was demolished in 1998. In 1990, the Imperial 400 became a Days Inn. In 1996, it became the Vagabond Inn.

Before his death in June 1997, Zeldin finalized a $12.5 million deal to sell the Tam O'Shanter to Sheldon Adelson's Las Vegas Sands, which later opened the adjacent Venetian resort in 1999. Adelson was a friend of Zeldin. Venetian officials purchased  of land, including the Tam O'Shanter, in October 1998. Bernie Zeldin's daughter, Leah Zeldin, operated the Tam O'Shanter until its closure. In December 2003, the Zeldin family was informed of the Venetian's plans to demolish the motel for a future resort. While there were no specific plans for the new resort's theme or construction date, company officials wanted the motel demolished so the land could be prepared for the future project, known as The Venetian Phase II, which would consist of a $1 billion resort with 3,000 rooms.

Tam O'Shanter closed on January 12, 2004. An asbestos-removal project for the motel took 19 days to complete. Tam O'Shanter was subsequently demolished on February 6, 2004, to make room for The Palazzo. The Vagabond Inn, which contained asbestos as well, was also demolished in February 2004. The asbestos-removal project cost between $500,000 and $1 million. The land had also been occupied by the Las Vegas Kosher Deli, as well as several small stores that were owned by the Venetian and were expected to close to make room for The Palazzo.

Construction

Foundation work on the $1.6 billion Palazzo began in September 2004, without a groundbreaking ceremony. As of February 27, 2006, the project had been under construction for over a year. Most of that time was spent digging the 4-story-deep hole to put in the underground parking structure. Then the building itself began to gradually rise upwards. The steel fabrication and erection was supplied by Schuff Steel Company. By November 2006, the hotel tower had reached the 35th floor. Construction of the ground floors, including the parking garage and shopping center, were well under way.

As of March 2007, the hotel tower's elevator core was complete, and the rooms area was rising to the top. The façade and windows were being installed on the lower floors. As of August 2007, the lettering on the side of the tower was finished and topped out.

Opening
As of December 20, 2007, the Palazzo was scheduled to open at least 1,000 rooms by December 28 in preparation for the Las Vegas New Year's celebration, America's Party. The casino and other areas of the Palazzo opened at 7pm on Sunday, December 30, 2007, after a delay of several days due to the Clark County permitting process.

The structural engineering was done by Walter P Moore Engineers and Consultants.
Parts of the resort were opened to the general public on December 30, 2007. The official grand opening took place on January 17, 2008.

in 2010, it was announced that it will be affiliated with InterContinental Hotels Group.

St. Regis Residences at the Venetian Palazzo, Las Vegas

The St. Regis Residences at the Venetian Palazzo, Las Vegas is an unfinished condominium tower located at 3355 South Las Vegas Boulevard, between the Palazzo and the Venetian.

In November 2006, Las Vegas Sands sought approval from the Clark County Commission to construct a 632-foot condominium tower on a portion of the Palazzo land. Construction of the $465 million tower began in early 2007, with pre-sales of the condominium units expected to begin by September. The tower was built atop a  retail building that was part of the Palazzo project. The retail building and the condominium tower were constructed on less than an acre of land which had previously been occupied by the Rosewood Grille restaurant. In September 2008, Las Vegas Sands and Starwood announced a partnership to open the tower as "The St. Regis Residences at the Venetian Palazzo, Las Vegas", named after the St. Regis Hotels & Resorts brand. The tower would include 398 units, and was expected to cost $600 million at that time. Under the deal, Starwood would manage the tower upon its opening, which was scheduled for March 2010.

In November 2008, Las Vegas Sands indefinitely suspended construction of the St. Regis because of the Great Recession. An additional 18 months of construction was needed to finish the project, which was to stand 50 stories high upon completion. In November 2009, Las Vegas Sands stated that work would remain suspended until the economy improved. In June 2011, Las Vegas Sands covered the unfinished building with a $1 million wrap made of giant cloth sheets that were printed to resemble a finished building. A company spokesman said that until a decision was made regarding the project, "We thought it was appropriate to improve it aesthetically in the meantime. We wanted it to look a little more like it belongs between a pair of five-diamond resorts like The Venetian and Palazzo." Michael Leven, president of Las Vegas Sands, had a view of the unfinished tower from his third-floor office, and later stated: "I couldn't stand looking at that steel. One day I was out at the pool and I realized our guests were looking up and staring at the steel. We put the cover on it and it's held up well. You sometimes forget it is there if you walk by."

In April 2014, Leven said that money was no longer an issue in completing the project, stating, "It's not a financial decision anymore, but we want to do the right thing," referring to the ultimate use of the building. Because of the uncertainty in the high-end, high-rise residential market, Leven stated that it was unlikely the tower would be completed as condominiums. Up to that time, Las Vegas Sands had considered finishing and opening the tower as timeshares, but Leven stated that "the numbers didn't work out". Leven further stated that finishing the tower as a third hotel-casino with its own entrance was unlikely. Also considered was finishing the tower as a hotel expansion for the Palazzo and Venetian.

Design

The $1.8 billion resort features a lobby where guests from the street arrive beneath a  glass dome with a two-story fountain. Those approaching from The Venetian make the transition through a towering octagonal structure and garden, itself topped by a glass-and-iron dome. Visitors to The Palazzo using the underground parking structure can take elevators or escalators from the underground garage and arrive in the center of the property's  casino.

The Palazzo Casino, like some other casinos on the Strip, operates under the license of a related casino—in this case The Venetian's license.

The Palazzo is LEED Silver Certified—the largest LEED certified building in the nation.

The Palazzo is reported to be the eleventh largest building in the world in terms of available floor space and is also currently the second-largest building in the Western Hemisphere.

Attractions

Dal Toro Las Vegas
The Las Vegas Car Museum is inside the multi-story Dal Toro restaurant, and features displays of automobiles from automakers including Bugatti, Spyker, Saleen, and Koenigsegg. The  showroom is decorated with marble and tile flooring, leather wall coverings, and artwork.  The space was originally a Lamborghini Las Vegas dealership. The restaurant stopped using the automaker's trademark after a lawsuit was filed.

Grand Canal Shoppes at The Venetian and The Palazzo
Features boutique stores from the likes of  Ralph Lauren, Jimmy Choo, Fendi, Cole Haan, Piaget, Diane von Furstenberg, Chloè, Bottega Veneta, Bulgari, Michael Kors, Burberry, Christian Louboutin, Catherine Malandrino, Anya Hindmarch, Charriol, and others. It also features an  Barneys New York.

See also

 List of tallest buildings in Las Vegas

References

External links

Las Vegas Sands Corp. corporate page about The Palazzo Las Vegas
Palazzo - Vegas Today and Tomorrow
Living in Las Vegas Podcast review of The Palazzo

Casinos in the Las Vegas Valley
Casinos completed in 2007
Hotel buildings completed in 2007
Skyscraper hotels in Paradise, Nevada
Resorts in the Las Vegas Valley
Hotels established in 2007
Casino hotels
2007 establishments in Nevada